Batu Lancang is a state constituency in Penang, Malaysia, that has been represented in the Penang State Legislative Assembly since 2004. It covers two of George Town's suburbs - Batu Lanchang and parts of Jelutong.

The state constituency was first contested in 1986 and is mandated to return a single Assemblyman to the Penang State Legislative Assembly under the first-past-the-post voting system. , the State Assemblyman for Batu Lancang is Ong Ah Teong from the Democratic Action Party (DAP), which is part of the state's ruling coalition, Pakatan Harapan (PH).

Definition

Polling districts 
According to the federal gazette issued on 30 March 2018, the Batu Lanchang constituency is divided into 10 polling districts.

This state seat encompasses all of the Batu Lanchang suburb and a small western portion of Jelutong up to Jelutong Road to the east.

To the west, the Batu Lancang seat is separated from the neighbouring Seri Delima constituency by Green Lane, with the affluent neighbourhood of Green Lane west of the road falling under Seri Delima. The Batu Lancang constituency also stretches north up to Free School Road and Jalan Perak.

Demographics

History 
During the 1995 State Election, Chong Eng from the DAP was elected as the State Assemblyman for Batu Lancang, becoming the first woman to be elected into the Penang State Legislative Assembly. Between 1995 and 1999, she was also the sole opposition assemblyman in the State Legislative Assembly, which was dominated at the time by the Barisan Nasional (BN) federal ruling coalition.

Election results 
The electoral results for the Batu Lancang state constituency in 2008, 2013 and 2018 are as follows.

See also 
 Constituencies of Penang

References 

Penang state constituencies